Benham is an unincorporated community in Brown Township, Ripley County, in the U.S. state of Indiana.

History
An old variant name of the community was Benhams Store. A post office opened under the name Benham Store in 1866, the name was shortened to Benham in 1888, and the post office was discontinued in 1934. John Benham, Jr., served as a first postmaster.

Geography

References

Unincorporated communities in Ripley County, Indiana
Unincorporated communities in Indiana